Acetone imine, or 2-propanimine is an organic compound and an imine with the chemical formula (CH3)2CNH. It is a volatile and flammable liquid at room temperature. It is the simplest ketimine. This compound is mainly of academic interest.

Synthesis and reactions
Acetone imine is prepared by dehydrocyanation of the cyanoamine of acetone, which is prepared from acetone cyanohydrin.  Dicyclohexylcarbodiimide (CyN=C=NCy) serves as the scavenger for hydrogen cyanide:
(CH3)2C(NH2)CN  + CyN=C=NCy → (CH3)2CNH + CyN(H)-C(CN)=NCy

The compound hydrolyzes readily:
(CH3)2CNH  +  H2O → (CH3)2CO + NH3
This reactivity is characteristic of imines derived from ammonia.  Methylene imine (CH2=NH) is also highly reactive, condensing to hexamethylenetetramine.  Upon standing, acetone imine undergoes further condensation to give the tetrahydropyrimidine called acetonin, with loss of ammonia.

The imine of hexafluoroacetone, ((CF3)2C=NH) is by contrast robust.

References

Imines